Gravity was a Twitter and social networking client for Symbian smartphones. Apart from Twitter it also connected to StatusNet, Facebook, Foursquare, Google reader, Sina Weibo and YouTube. It was developed by Jan Ole Suhr.

In 2017 an Android based version of Gravity has been released. Due to licensing issues it just offers Twitter and a RSS reader.

References

Symbian software
Twitter services and applications